Gianfranco Bonera (born 2 April 1945 in Porpetto, Province of Udine) is an Italian former Grand Prix motorcycle road racer. His best year was in 1974 when he won the Nations Grand Prix and finished second to his MV Agusta teammate, Phil Read, in the 500cc world championship. He switched to the 250cc class in 1976, racing for the Harley-Davidson factory racing team on Aermacchi machines rebadged after being purchased by the American firm. He won the 250cc Spanish Grand Prix and finished the season in third place behind his Harley-Davidson teammate, Walter Villa and Yamaha's Takazumi Katayama.

Grand Prix motorcycle racing results 
Points system from 1969 onwards:

(key) (Races in bold indicate pole position; races in italics indicate fastest lap)

References 

1945 births
Living people
People from Porpetto
Italian motorcycle racers
250cc World Championship riders
350cc World Championship riders
500cc World Championship riders
Sportspeople from Friuli-Venezia Giulia